Eliza Orlins (born December 25, 1982) is an American lawyer and television personality from New York City. She is best known for her appearances on Survivor and The Amazing Race. Orlins is also a public defender with The Legal Aid Society. In 2020, she announced her candidacy for the 2021 New York County District Attorney election.

Early life
Orlins was born in New York City, and grew up between New York and China. She attended Hong Kong International School while in Hong Kong, and Sidwell Friends School after returning to the United States. Orlins graduated summa cum laude from Syracuse University (2005), and cum laude from Fordham University School of Law (2008). She is Jewish, and her grandmother escaped Nazi persecution by fleeing Paris during World War II.

Eliza's father, Stephen Orlins, has served as the president of the National Committee on United States–China Relations since 2005. Eliza's mother, Washington, D.C.-based writer Susan Orlins, appeared on the 11th episode of Survivor: Vanuatu as part of the loved ones visit challenge, which Eliza won. Eliza has two younger sisters, Sabrina and Emily, the former of whom was adopted from Beijing.

Television appearances

Survivor: Vanuatu

In 2004, Orlins competed on the ninth season of the CBS reality show Survivor, entitled Survivor: Vanuatu. Orlins started the season sorted onto the all-female Yasur tribe. Orlins caught the ire of her alliance when she flipped to vote out an indecisive swing voter in Dolly Neely in the second episode. At the merge, the six remaining female castaways re-aligned, and the group voted out their male competitors until only Chris Daugherty remained. Despite Daugherty losing immunity, Leann Slaby sought to eliminate Orlins. After Daugherty was informed by Julie Berry that he was safe, he successfully worked with Twila Tanner and Scout Cloud Lee to convince Orlins to vote out Slaby. After Ami Cusack was voted out, Orlins re-aligned with Berry due to her annoyance of Tanner. Orlins then won immunity but was unsuccessful in convincing Daugherty resulting in Berry's elimination. Orlins was then the 15th person voted out the next day during the finale on Day 37, finishing in 4th place.

Survivor: Micronesia

Orlins returned seven seasons later on Survivor: Micronesia. Orlins started the season on the returnee player Malakal tribe. Orlins formed an alliance with Ami Cusack, Yau-Man Chan, and Jonathan Penner. Despite being targeted by an opposing alliance, Orlins survived the first Tribal Council after Jonny Fairplay asked to be voted out to be with his pregnant girlfriend. However, in the following days, all of Orlins's original allies had been eliminated leaving Orlins as the target of Parvati Shallow when the tribes merged in the ninth episode. After Jason Siska won individual immunity, he agreed to give Orlins what he believed to be a hidden immunity idol, which in reality was a stick carved by Ozzy Lusth. Orlins was then eliminated, becoming the first member of the season's jury.

The Amazing Race

In 2018, Orlins competed on the thirty-first season of The Amazing Race, which aired in 2019 and featured teams from CBS reality shows Big Brother, Survivor, and The Amazing Race, with fellow Survivor contestant Corinne Kaplan. In the fourth episode Kaplan and Orlins fell behind after Orlins struggled with a task that involved driving a scooter through a driving test course in Ho Chi Minh City. The two finished in last place after checking-in at the finish mat behind Rachel Reilly and Elissa Slater and were eliminated in ninth place.

Other appearances
Orlins has also appeared on Reality Obsessed, The Dr. Oz Show, and The Beat with Ari Melber.

Filmography

Television

Legal career
After graduating from law school, Orlins worked as a public defender for The Legal Aid Society. Over a decade, Orlins represented over 3,000 clients.

2021 Manhattan District Attorney primary
On March 5, 2020, Orlins announced her candidacy for the New York County District Attorney Democratic primary to replace incumbent district attorney Cyrus Vance Jr. Orlins finished seventh in the Democratic primary with 4.2% of the vote.

References

External links

Campaign website
Eliza Orlins biography for Survivor: Vanuatu at CBS.com
Eliza Orlins biography for Survivor: Micronesia at CBS.com
Corinne Kaplan and Eliza Orlins biography for The Amazing Race 31 at CBS.com

1982 births
Living people
New York (state) Democrats
Lawyers from New York City
21st-century American women lawyers
21st-century American lawyers
Sidwell Friends School alumni
Syracuse University alumni
Fordham University School of Law alumni
Survivor (American TV series) contestants
The Amazing Race (American TV series) contestants
Women in New York (state) politics
Candidates in the 2021 United States elections